Jewish players and theoreticians have long been involved in the game of chess and have significantly contributed to the development of chess, which has been described as the "Jewish National game". Chess gained popularity amongst Jews in the twelfth century. The game was privileged by distinguished rabbis, as well as by women.

Of the first 13 undisputed world champions, over half were Jewish, including the first two. The Modern School of Chess espoused by Wilhelm Steinitz and Siegbert Tarrasch; the Hypermodernism influenced by Aron Nimzowitsch and Richard Réti; and the Soviet Chess School promoted by Mikhail Botvinnik were all strongly influenced by Jewish players. Other influential Jewish chess theoreticians, writers and players include Johannes Zukertort, Savielly Tartakower, Emanuel Lasker, Akiba Rubinstein, Gyula Breyer, Rudolf Spielmann, Samuel Reshevsky, Reuben Fine, David Bronstein, Miguel Najdorf, Mikhail Tal and Bobby Fischer.

Professor Arpad Elo, the inventor of the scientific rating system employed by FIDE, analysed some 476 major tournament players from the nineteenth century onward, and of the fifty-one highest ranked players, approximately one-half were Jewish. One of the strongest ever players is Garry Kasparov, who was world No. 1 from 1985 until his retirement in 2005; or the considered strongest female chess player in history Judit Polgár.

Beersheba in Israel is the city with the most chess grandmasters per capita in the world. Israel has also won one silver and one bronze medal at Chess Olympiads.

List
The list refers to chess players who are Jewish and have attained outstanding achievements in chess.

 Aaron (Albert) Alexandre (c. 1765–1850), German-born French-English
 Simon Alapin (1856–1923), Lithuanian
 Lev Alburt (born 1945), Russian/American
 Izaak Appel (1905–1941), Polish, killed by the Nazis
 Lev Aronin (1920–1982), Russian/Soviet
 Levon Aronian (born 1982), Armenian grandmaster, World Cup champion twice
 Arnold Aurbach (c. 1888–1952), Polish-born French
 Yuri Averbakh (1922–2022), Russian, 2445
 Mary Weiser Bain (1904–1972), born in Hungary (now sub-Carpathian Ukraine), immigrated to the United States as a teenager, first American woman to represent the U.S. in an organized chess competition, won the U.S. Women's Chess Championship in 1951, awarded the Woman International Master title in 1952
 Anjelina Belakovskaia (born 1969), Ukrainian-born US woman grandmaster
 Alexander Beliavsky (born 1953), Ukrainian-born Soviet/Slovenian grandmaster
 Joel Benjamin (born 1964), American grandmaster
 Ossip Bernstein (1882–1962), Ukrainian-born French grandmaster
 Arthur Bisguier (1929–2017), US grandmaster, 2455
 Abram Blass (1896–1971), Polish
 Isaac Boleslavsky (1919–1977), Ukrainian-born Soviet grandmaster
 Mikhail Botvinnik (1911–1995), Russian/Soviet grandmaster and World champion
 Gyula Breyer (1893–1921), Hungarian, pioneer of the hypermodern school, important chess theorist, blindfold simultan record holder
 David Bronstein (1924–2006), Ukrainian-born Soviet grandmaster, 2590
 Oscar Chajes (1873–1928), Ukrainian/Polish/Austrian-born US
 Vitaly Chekhover (1908–1965), Russian
 Erich Cohn (1884–1918), German
 Wilhelm Cohn (1859–1913), German
 Moshe Czerniak (1910–1984), Polish-born Israeli
 Arnold Denker (1914–2005), US grandmaster, 2293
 Arthur Dunkelblum (1906–1979), Polish-born Belgian
 Mark Dvoretsky (1947–2016), noted Russian trainer and international master
 Roman Dzindzichashvili (born 1944), Georgian-born Israeli American grandmaster, 2550
 Vereslav Eingorn (born 1956), Ukrainian grandmaster
 Berthold Englisch (1851–1897), Austrian
 Larry Evans (1932–2010), US grandmaster, 2530
 Rafał Feinmesser (1895–?), Polish, killed in Warsaw during Holocaust
 Reuben Fine (1914–1993), US grandmaster
 Bobby Fischer (1943–2008), US grandmaster and World champion
 Alexander Flamberg (1880–1926), Polish
 Salo Flohr (1908–1983), Ukrainian-born Czech and Soviet grandmaster
 Henryk Friedman (1903–1942), Polish, killed by the Nazis
 Paulino Frydman (1905–1982), Polish-born Argentine
 Boris Gelfand (born 1968), Belarusian-born Israeli grandmaster, World Cup champion
 Efim Geller (1925–1998), Ukrainian-born Soviet grandmaster
 Harry Golombek (1911–1995), English
 Eduard Gufeld (1936–2002), Ukrainian grandmaster, 2565
 Boris Gulko (born 1947), German-born Russian US grandmaster, 2644
 Isidor Gunsberg (1854–1930), Hungarian-born English
 Ilya Gurevich (born 1972), Russian-born US grandmaster and junior World champion, 2575
 Mikhail Gurevich (born 1959), Ukrainian-born Russian Turkish grandmaster, 2694
 Dmitry Gurevich Born in 1956, Russian/American grandmaster
 Lev Gutman (born 1945), Latvian-born Israeli German grandmaster, 2547
 Daniel Harrwitz (1821–1884), Prussian/Polish/German-born English French
 Israel Horowitz (1907–1973), US
 Bernhard Horwitz (1807–1885), German-born English
 Dawid Janowski (1868–1927), Belarusian/Polish-born French grandmaster
 Max Judd (1851–1906), US
 Gregory Kaidanov (born 1959), Ukrainian-born Russian US grandmaster, 2695
 Julio Kaplan (born 1950), Argentine-born Puerto Rican US grandmaster and World junior champion
 Mona May Karff (1908–1998), Moldovan-born US woman master
 Isaac Kashdan (1905–1985), US grandmaster
 Garry Kasparov (born 1963), Russian grandmaster, former World Chess Champion

 Alexander Khalifman (born 1966), Russian grandmaster and World champion, 2702
 Stanisław Kohn (1895–1940), Polish, killed by the Nazis
 Ignatz von Kolisch (1837–1889), Hungarian/Slovakian-born Austrian grandmaster
 George Koltanowski (1903–2000), Belgian-born US grandmaster
 Viktor Korchnoi (1931–2016), Russian-born grandmaster
 Yair Kraidman (born 1932), Israeli grandmaster, 2455
 Leon Kremer (1901–1941), Polish
 Abraham Kupchik (1892–1970), Belarusian/Polish-born US
 Alla Kushnir (1941–2013), Russian Israeli woman grandmaster, 2430
 Salo Landau (1903–1944), Polish-born Dutch, killed by the Nazis
 Berthold Lasker (1860–1928), Prussian/German/Polish-born master, elder brother of Emanuel Lasker
 Edward Lasker (1885–1981), Polish/German-born US
 Emanuel Lasker (1868–1941), Prussian/German/Polish-born US grandmaster and World champion
 Anatoly Lein (1931–2018), Russian/Soviet/American grandmaster
 Konstantin Lerner (1950–2011), Ukrainian/Israeli grandmaster
 Grigory Levenfish (1889–1961), Polish/Russian-born grandmaster
 Irina Levitina (born 1954), Russian-born US woman grandmaster
 Vladimir Liberzon (1937–1996), Russian-born Israeli grandmaster
 Andor Lilienthal (1911–2010), Russian-born Hungarian/Soviet grandmaster
 Samuel Lipschütz (1863–1905), Austria-Hungary/American
 Johann Löwenthal (1810–1876), Hungarian-born US English
 Moishe Lowtzky (1881–1940), Ukrainian-born Polish, killed by Nazis
 Gyula Makovetz (1860–1903), Hungarian
 Jonathan Mestel (born 1957), English grandmaster and World U-16 champion, 2540
 Houshang Mashian (born 1938), Iranian-Israeli chess master
 Jacques Mieses (1865–1954), German-born English grandmaster
 Miguel Najdorf (1910–1997), Polish-born Polish/Argentine grandmaster
 Daniel Naroditsky (born 1995), American grandmaster and chess streamer
 Ian Nepomniachtchi (born 1990), Russian grandmaster
 Aron Nimzowitsch (1886–1935), Latvian-born Danish
 Isaías Pleci (1907–1979), Argentine
 Judit Polgár (born 1976), Hungarian grandmaster, 2735
 Susan Polgár (born 1969), Hungarian-born US grandmaster and World champion, 2577
 Zsófia Polgár (born 1974), Hungarian-born Israeli international master, 2500
 Lev Polugaevsky (1934–1995), Belarusian/Soviet grandmaster, 2640
 Dawid Przepiórka (1880–1940), Polish, killed by Nazis
 Lev Psakhis (born 1958), Russian/Soviet/Israeli grandmaster
 Abram Rabinovich (1878–1943), Lithuanian/Russian
 Ilya Rabinovich (1891–1942), Russian
 Teimour Radjabov (born 1987), Azerbaijani grandmaster
 Nukhim Rashkovsky (1946–2023), Russian grandmaster
 Éloi Relange (born 1976), French grandmaster
 Samuel Reshevsky (1911–1992), Polish-born US grandmaster
 Richard Réti (1889–1929), Slovakian/Hungarian-born Czech
 Maxim Rodshtein (born 1989), Israeli U-16 World champion
 Kenneth Rogoff (born 1953), US grandmaster
 Samuel Rosenthal (1837–1902), Polish-born French
 Eduardas Rozentalis (born 1963), Lithuanian grandmaster
 Levy Rozman (born 1995), American chess master
 Akiba Rubinstein (1880–1961), Polish grandmaster
 Gersz Salwe (1862–1920), Polish grandmaster
 Leonid Shamkovich (1923–2005), Soviet/Israeli/Canadian/American grandmaster
 Yury Shulman (born 1975), Belarusian/Soviet/American grandmaster
 Gennady Sosonko (born 1943), Russian-born Dutch grandmaster
 Jon Speelman (born 1956), English grandmaster
 Rudolf Spielmann (1883–1942), Austrian-born Swedish
 Leonid Stein (1934–1973), Ukrainian-born Russian grandmaster
 Endre Steiner (1901–1944), Hungarian, killed by the Nazis
 Herman Steiner (1905–1955), Slovakian/Hungarian-born US
 Lajos Steiner (1903–1975), Romanian/Hungarian-born Australian
 Wilhelm Steinitz (1836–1900), Czech-born Austrian and US grandmaster and World champion
 Emil Sutovsky (born 1977), Israeli grandmaster, 2697
 Peter Svidler (born 1976), Russian grandmaster, World Cup champion
 László Szabó (1917–1998), Hungarian grandmaster
 Mark Taimanov (1926–2016), Soviet/Russian grandmaster
 Mikhail Tal (1936–1992), Soviet/Latvian grandmaster and World champion, 2645
 Siegbert Tarrasch (1862–1934), Polish/German grandmaster and Senior World champion
 Savielly Tartakower (1887–1956), Russian-born Austrian/Polish/French grandmaster
 Anna Ushenina (born 1985), Ukraine-born Women's World Champion
 Anatoly Vaisser (born 1949), Kazakh-born Soviet/French grandmaster
 Joshua Waitzkin (born 1976), American Junior Champion and martial arts champion
 Max Weiss (1857–1927), Slovakian/Hungarian-born Austrian
 Simon Winawer (1838–1919), Polish
 Leonid Yudasin (born 1959), Russian-born Israeli grandmaster, 2692
 Tatiana Zatulovskaya (1935–2017), Azerbaijani-born Russian Israeli woman grandmaster
 Mark Stolberg (1922–1942) Russian 
 Johannes Zukertort (1842–1888), Polish-born German English

See also
 List of Jewish American sportspeople
 List of Jewish sports commissioners, managers and coaches, officials, owners, promoters, and sportscasters
 List of Jews in sports
 Jewish Sports Review
 International Jewish Sports Hall of Fame
 National Jewish Sports Hall of Fame and Museum

References

Further reading

 Jews and the Sporting Life, Vol. 23 of Studies in Contemporary Jewry, Ezra Mendelsohn, Oxford University Press US, 2009, 
 The Big Book of Jewish Athletes: Two Centuries of Jews in Sports – a Visual History, Peter S. Horvitz, Joachim Horvitz, S P I Books, 2007, 
 The Big Book of Jewish Sports Heroes: An Illustrated Compendium of Sports History and The 150 Greatest Jewish Sports Stars, Peter S. Horvitz, SP Books, 2007, 
 Jews, Sports, and the Rites of Citizenship, Jack Kugelmass, University of Illinois Press, 2007, 
 Emancipation through Muscles: Jews and Sports in Europe, Michael Brenner, Gideon Reuveni, translated by Brenner, Reuveni, U of Nebraska Press, 2006, 
 Judaism's Encounter with American Sports, Jeffrey S. Gurock, Indiana University Press, 2005, 
 Great Jews in Sports, Robert Slater, Jonathan David Publishers, 2004, 
 Jewish Sports Legends: the International Jewish Hall of Fame, 3rd Ed, Joseph Siegman, Brassey's, 2000, 
 Sports and the American Jew, Steven A. Riess, Syracuse University Press, 1998, 
 Ellis Island to Ebbets Field: Sport and the American Jewish Experience, Peter Levine, Oxford University Press US, 1993, 
 The Jewish Athletes Hall of Fame, B. P. Robert Stephen Silverman, Shapolsky Publishers, 1989, 
 The Great Jewish Chess Champions, Harold U. Ribalow, Meir Z. Ribalow, Hippocrene Books, 1987, 
 From the Ghetto to the Games: Jewish Athletes in Hungary, Andrew Handler, East European Monographs, 1985, 
 The Jew in American Sports, Harold Uriel Ribalow, Meir Z. Ribalow, Edition 4, Hippocrene Books, 1985, 
 The Jewish Athlete: A Nostalgic View, Leible Hershfield, s.n., 1980
 Encyclopedia of Jews in Sports, Bernard Postal, Jesse Silver, Roy Silver, Bloch Pub. Co., 1965
 Chess, Jews, and history, by Victor Keats, 1994, Oxford Academia Publishers, 
Chess Among the Jews: A Translation and Explanation of the Work of Moritz Steinschneider, by Victor Keats, 1995, 
Chess in Jewish history and Hebrew literature, by Victor Keats, 1995, Magnes Press, 
Can I Play Chess on Shabbas, by Joe Bobker, 2008, . 
 Jewish chess masters on stamps, by Felix Berkovich and N. J. Divinsky, McFarland, 2000, .

External links 
 JEWISH WORLD CHESS CHAMPIONS (44% of undisputed world champions) JINFO.org

 
Jews
Chess
Lists of sportspeople